In topological data analysis, a simplex tree is a type of trie used to represent efficiently any general simplicial complex. Through its nodes, this data structure notably explicitly represents all the simplices. Its flexible structure allows implementation of many basic operations useful to computing persistent homology. This data structure was invented by Jean-Daniel Boissonnat and Clément Maria in 2014, in the article The Simplex Tree: An Efficient Data Structure for General Simplicial Complexes. This data structure offers efficient operations on sparse simplicial complexes. For dense or maximal simplices, Skeleton-Blocker representations or Toplex Map representations are used.

Definitions 
Many researchers in topological data analysis consider the simplex tree to be the most compact simplex-based data structure for simplicial complexes, and a data structure allowing an intuitive understanding of simplicial complexes due to integrated usage of their mathematical properties.

Heuristic definition 
Consider any simplicial complex is a set composed of points (0 dimensions), line segments (1 dimension), triangles (2 dimensions), and their n-dimensional counterparts, called n-simplexes within a topological space. By the mathematical properties of simplexes, any n-simplex is composed of multiple -simplexes. Thus, lines are composed of points, triangles of lines, tetrahedrons of triangle.  Notice each higher level adds 1 vertex to the vertices of the n-simplex. The data structure is simplex-based, therefore, it should represent all simplexes uniquely by the points defining the simplex. A simple way to achieve this is to define each simplex by its points in sorted order.

Now, construct a dictionary size  containing all vertex labels in order. This represents the 0-dimensional  simplexes. Represent this step on k levels. Clearly, considering the first dictionary as depth 0, any entry at depth  of any dictionary in this data structure uniquely represents a -simplex within . For completeness, the point to the initial dictionary is considered the representation of the empty simplex. For practicality of the operations, labels that are repeated on the same level are linked together, forming a looped linked list. Finally, child dictionaries also have pointers to their parent dictionary, for fast ancestor access.

Constructive definition 
Let  be a simplicial complex of dimension k. We begin by decomposing the simplicial complex into mutually exclusive simplexes. This can be achieved in a greedy way by iteratively removing from the simplicial complex the highest order simplexes until the simplicial complex is empty. Ordering the labels ensures no repetition in the simplex tree, as there is only one way to describe a simplex. We start with a null root, representing the null simplex. Then, we iterate through all simplexes, and through each label of each simplex word. If the label is available as a child to the current root, make that child the temporary root of the insertion process, otherwise, create a new node for the child, make it the new temporary root, and continue with the rest of the word. During this process, k dictionaries are maintained with all the labels and insert the address of the node for the corresponding label. If an address is already at that space in the dictionary, a pointer is created from the old node to the new node. Once the process is finished all children of each node are entered into a dictionary, and all pointers are loop to make looped linked lists. A wide range of dictionaries could be applied here, like hash tables, but some operations assume the possibility of an ordered traversal of the entries, leading most of the implementations to use red-black trees are dictionaries.

Operations 
While simplex trees are not the most space efficient data structures for simplicial complex representation, their operations on sparse data are considered state-of-art. Here, we give the bounds of different useful operations possible through this representation. Many implementations of these operations are available.

We first introduce the notation. Notice .

 Computing persistent homology, or in a more involved way, computing Betti numbers, using a simplex tree most efficiently remains an open problem, however, current algorithms for this task on sparse simplicial complexes achieve state-of-art performance.
 The structure of simplex trees allows for elementary collapse of collapsible simplexes, however the bounds of this operation in the general case are unknown.
 A subcase of elementary collapse is edge-contraction. Edge contraction can be 

As for construction, as seeing in the constructive definition, construction is proportional to the number and complexity of simplexes in the simplicial complex. This can be especially expensive if the simplicial complex is dense. However, some optimizations for particular simplicial complexes, including for Flag complexes, Rips complexes and Witness complexes.

Applications 
Simplex tree are efficient in sparse simplicial complexes. For this purpose, many persistent homology algorithms focusing on high-dimensional real data (often sparse) use simplex trees within these algorithms. While simplex trees are not as efficient as incidence matrix, their simplex-based structure allows them to be useful efficient for simplicial complex storage within persistent homology algorithms.

References